Manual therapy, or manipulative therapy, is a physical treatment primarily used by physical therapists, physiotherapists, occupational therapists to treat musculoskeletal pain and disability; it mostly  includes kneading and manipulation of muscles, joint mobilization and joint manipulation. It is also used by Rolfers, massage therapists, athletic trainers, osteopaths, and physicians.

A 2011 literature review indicates that placebo is one of likely many potentially relevant mechanisms through which manual therapy improves clinical outcomes related to musculoskeletal pain conditions.

Definitions 

Irvin Korr, J. S. Denslow and colleagues did the original body of research on manual therapy. Korr described it as the "Application of an accurately determined and specifically directed manual force to the body, in order to improve mobility in areas that are restricted; in joints, in connective tissues or in skeletal muscles."

According to the Orthopaedic Manual Physical Therapy Description of Advanced Specialty Practice manual therapy is defined as a clinical approach utilizing specific hands-on techniques, including but not limited to manipulation/mobilization, used by the physical therapist to diagnose and treat soft tissues and joint structures for the purpose of modulating pain; increasing range of motion (ROM); reducing or eliminating soft tissue inflammation; inducing relaxation; improving contractile and non-contractile tissue repair, extensibility, and/or stability; facilitating movement; and improving function.

A consensus study of US chiropractors defined manual therapy (generally known as the "chiropractic adjustment" in the profession) as "Procedures by which the hands directly contact the body to treat the articulations and/or soft tissues."

Use and method 

In Western Europe, North America and Australasia, manual therapy is usually practiced by members of specific health care professions (e.g. Chiropractors, Occupational Therapists, Osteopaths, Osteopathic physicians, Physiotherapists/Physical Therapists, Massage Therapists and Physiatrists). However, some lay practitioners (not members of a structured profession), such as bonesetters also provide some forms of manual therapy.

A survey released in May 2004 by the National Center for Complementary and Integrative Health focused on who used complementary and alternative medicine (CAM), what was used, and why it was used in the United States by adults during 2002. Massage was the fifth most commonly use CAM in the United States in 2007.

Techniques 
 Myofascial therapy targets the muscle and fascial systems, promotes flexibility and mobility of the body's connective tissues. It is said to mobilize adhesions and reduce severity/sensitivity of scarring. A critical analysis finds that the relevance of fascia to therapy doubtful.
 Massage may be used as part of a treatment. Proponents claim this may reduce inflammation. Science writer Paul Ingraham notes that there is no evidence to support the claim.
 Friction massage is said to increase mobilization of adhesions between fascial layers, muscles, compartments and other soft tissues. They are thought to create an inflammatory response and instigate focus to injured areas. A 2002 systematic review found that no additional benefit was incurred from the inclusion of deep tissue friction massage in a therapeutic regimen, although the conclusions were limited by the small sample sizes in available randomized clinical trials.
 Soft Tissue Technique is firm, direct pressure to relax hypertonic muscles and stretch tight fascial structures. A 2015 review concluded that the technique is ineffective for lower back pain, and the quality of research testing its effectiveness is poor.
 Trigger point techniques claim to address myofascial trigger points, though the explanation of how this works is controversial.

Stretching 

From the main article's effectiveness section:
 Apart from before running, stretching does not appear to reduce risk of injury during exercise.
 Some evidence shows that pre-exercise stretching may increase range of movement.
 The Mayo Clinic advises against bouncing, and to hold for thirty seconds. They suggest warming up before stretching or stretching post-exercise.

Taping 

Manual therapy practitioners often use therapeutic taping to relieve pressure on injured soft tissue, alter muscle firing patterns or prevent re-injury.  Some techniques are designed to enhance lymphatic fluid exchange. After a soft tissue injury to muscles or tendons from sports activities, over exertion or repetitive strain injury swelling may impede blood flow to the area and slow healing.  Elastic taping methods may relieve pressure from swollen tissue and enhance circulation to the injured area.

According to the medical and skeptical community there is no known benefit from this technique and it is a pseudoscience.

Styles of manual therapy 

There are many different styles of manual therapy. It is a fundamental feature of ayurvedic medicine, traditional Chinese medicine and some forms of alternative medicine as well as being used by mainstream medical practitioners. Hands-on bodywork is a feature of therapeutic interactions in traditional cultures around the world.

 Acupressure
 Anma
 Bobath concept
 Bodywork (alternative medicine)
 Bone setting
 Bowen Technique
 Chiropractic
 Cranio-sacral therapy
 Dorn method
 Joint manipulation
 Joint mobilization
 Spinal manipulation
 Spinal mobilization
 Massage therapy
 Manual lymphatic drainage
 Medical acupuncture
 Muscle energy techniques
 Myofascial release (MFR)
 Myotherapy
 Naprapathy
 Osteopathic manipulative medicine
 Osteopathy
 Physiotherapy
 Polarity therapy
 Postural Integration
 Rolfing
 Shiatsu
 Siddha Medicine
 Structural Integration
 Traction
 Tui na
 Zero Balancing

Efficacy
Due to the wide range of issues with various parts of the body and different techniques used, as well as a lack of modeling behavior, it can be difficult to tell just how effective manual therapy can be for a patient.

Results for migraines, headaches, and asthma are mixed due to a lack of clinical trials, though at least one article states that manual therapy is effective for asthma.

Manual therapy was shown to be effective for treating back pain, with trigger point therapy being used for myofascial pain, and manual manipulation for lower back pain.

See also 
 Body psychotherapy
 McKenzie method
 Osteopathy
 Physical therapy
 Qigong
 Siddha medicine
 Fascial Manipulation

References

Further reading

Journals 
 The Journal of Manual and Manipulative Therapy
 Journal of Manipulative and Physiological Therapeutics - PubMed access found here

Books

External links

 American Academy of Orthopaedic Manual Physical Therapists
 American Organization for Bodywork Therapies of Asia
 Manual Therapy Foundation of India
 International Federation of Orthopaedic Manipulative Therapists

 
Orthopedic surgical procedures
Concepts in alternative medicine